Edessaikos Football Club is a Greek football club based in Edessa, Greece currently playing in the Gamma Ethniki (third tier). Edessaikos was founded in 1960 and has won the Gamma Ethniki a record 4 times (1977, 1983, 1987, 1989).

History
Edessaikos is a football club based in Edessa Greece. It was founded in 1960 when three local clubs – Aris, Iraklis, Ethnikos – merged. Edessaikos was a founding member of the Pella Football Clubs Association in 1971. The club has participated in the Greek Football A Division between 1993 and 1997. From 2010 to 2017, Edesaikos competed in the A1 League of Pella (fifth tier overall), after getting relegated from Delta Ethniki during the 2009–10 season. Edessaikos also has a well-organised youth academy system. Edessaiko's academies the season 2011–2012 was champions of the 1st group of Pella on 98–97 ages.

On 21 May 2017, Edessaikos won the Championship by winning 1–0 at the final. Since then, the team competes in Gamma Ethniki.

Players

Current squad

Honours

Greek Cup
Semi-finals: 1995–96

Balkans Cup
Winners (1): 1993

Colours and badge
Traditionally the club's colours are green and white. Edessaikos' badge consists of a trident, together with the name of the club placed above the trident. Edessaikos fans aren't many, but they are passionate. Their nickname is "WaterBoys".

References

External links
 Ένωση Ποδοσφαρικών Σωματείων Πέλλας-Pella Football Clubs Association 

Football clubs in Central Macedonia
Association football clubs established in 1960
1960 establishments in Greece
Edessa, Greece
Gamma Ethniki clubs